In molecular biology, glycoside hydrolase family 70 is a family of glycoside hydrolases.

Glycoside hydrolases  are a widespread group of enzymes that hydrolyse the glycosidic bond between two or more carbohydrates, or between a carbohydrate and a non-carbohydrate moiety. A classification system for glycoside hydrolases, based on sequence similarity, has led to the definition of >100 different families. This classification is available on the CAZy web site, and also discussed at CAZypedia, an online encyclopedia of carbohydrate active enzymes.

This family includes glucosyltransferases or sucrose 6-glycosyl transferases (GTF-S) (CAZY GH_70) which catalyse the transfer of D-glucopyramnosyl units from sucrose onto acceptor molecules. Some members of this family contain a cell wall-binding repeat.

References

EC 3.2.1
GH family
Protein families